The Political Department of the People's Liberation Army Navy is one of the main departments of the People's Liberation Army Navy. Its director is ranked at the deputy military region grade.

List of directors

References

Further reading
 
 

People's Liberation Army Navy